The Chinese sleeper (Perccottus glenii), also known as the Amur sleeper, is a species of freshwater sleeper native to the Amur River basin in eastern Asia with introduced populations in other regions of Eurasia.  It is currently the only known member of its genus.

Description 

The Chinese sleeper, known as rotan in Russia, resembles a perch, ruffe, or sculpin. The eyes are placed high on the head, which has a rounded snout and projecting lower jaw. There is little or no gap between the two dorsal fins, the front one of which has six to eight spines and the back one, nine to eleven soft rays. The anal fin has one to three spines and seven to ten soft rays. The pelvic fins are not fused together, which helps to distinguish this fish from the gobies. The second dorsal and the anal fins are both more rounded and shorter than the gobies and the caudal fin is also more rounded. The general colour is brownish with a checker-board pattern of darker marks or dark barring. There are dark lines on the head radiating from the eye.

Distribution and habitat 
The Chinese sleeper is native to the inland waters of north-eastern China, northern North Korea, and the Russian Far East. Specimens were first transported to Saint Petersburg from the River Zeya  in 1912 by a scientific expedition as ornamental fish. During the 1920s, the Chinese sleeper invaded many water bodies around Saint Petersburg and in the 1950s, it was recorded in the shallow waters of the Gulf of Finland in the Baltic Sea and was considered an invasive species. Its typical habitat is ponds, closed water-bodies, and slow-moving streams. The westernmost locality of the Chinese sleeper range is the ponds in the Bavarian Danube basin in Germany. A finding in the mesohaline environment is registered in the North-Western Black Sea in Ukraine.

Invasiveness 
In Europe, the Chinese sleeper has been included in the list of Invasive Alien Species of Union concern (the Union list) since 2016. This implies that this species cannot be imported, bred, transported, commercialized, or intentionally released into the environment in the whole of the European Union. At least one case of monospecific fish community composed of Chinese sleeper is registered in Latvia. In the late summer of 2022, a small community of Chinese sleepers was found in a single pond in southwest Finland, the first record of the species in the country. This fish has been reported from Czechia recently

Behaviour 
The Chinese sleeper is an adaptable species and is tolerant of widely different conditions. It feeds on insects and their larvae, small crustaceans, and fish fry. It spawns in warm shallows among vegetation and the male guards the eggs.

Economic importance 
This species is of minor importance to local commercial fisheries and has potential as an aquarium fish.  However, introduced populations are of concern as they could become detrimental to the local fauna due to its predatory nature and voracious appetite.

References 

Odontobutidae
Fish of East Asia
Fish of Russia
Freshwater fish of China
Fish of Korea
Monotypic fish genera
Taxa named by Benedykt Dybowski
Fish described in 1877
Invasive animal species in Europe
Invasive species in Ukraine